WMM may refer to:
 Well-Manicured Man, a character in The X-Files
 West Midlands Metro, a light-rail/tram system in West Midlands, England
 Wide Mouth Mason, a Canadian blues-rock band
 Windows Movie Maker, a video editing software package, and file format extension
 Wi-Fi Multimedia or Wireless Multimedia Extensions (WME), a QoS implementation
 Women Make Movies, an organization for women film-makers
 World Magnetic Model, a digital model of the Earth's geomagnetic field
 World Marathon Majors, championship style marathon competition